Gordon Bowker (1934–14 January 2019) was an English journalist and academic who wrote biographies of Malcolm Lowry, Lawrence Durrell, George Orwell and James Joyce.

Life and works
Bowker grew up in a Birmingham devastated by bombing during the second World War, where he attended grammar school at King Edward VI Camp Hill. At the age of 16, he struck out on his own by travelling to Australia for two years sheep farming, followed by three years in the RAF serving in Cyprus and Egypt. Bowker had always wanted to write, which drew him in to teaching back in Birmingham, qualifying from Saltley College in 1957.

Later, he went on to read English, Sociology and Philosophy at Nottingham and London Universities, where he completed his Ph.D. Bowker was a lecturer at Goldsmiths' College from 1966 to 1991 when he began writing dramas and documentaries for radio and television as well as stories, articles and reviews for The Independent, The Observer, The Sunday Times, The Times Literary Supplement, The New York Times, Slightly Foxed, The London Magazine, Plays and Players, The Listener, The Times Educational Supplement and The Illustrated London News.

After leaving Goldsmiths' College in 1991, Bowker focused his attention on writing literary biography, starting with Pursued by Furies: a Life of Malcolm Lowry, which he originally published in 1993. His first biography became a New York Times Best Seller and "Notable Book of the Year" in 1995. The following year, Bowker published Through the Dark Labyrinth: a Biography of Lawrence Durrell.

Over the next five years, Bowker turned his attention to George Orwell, publishing a biography of Orwell in 2003 to commemorate a century since that writer's birth. Over the next few years, Bowker expanded his Orwell interests, promoting the re-publication of a book that revealed insights in to Orwell’s childhood (Eric & Us), and actively participating in the establishment of The Orwell Society, writing articles for The Orwell Foundation as well as Orwell Direct. In 2011, Bowker published what was to be his last book, James Joyce: a New Biography.

In 2022, the Society of Authors created a new prize called the Gordon Bowker Volcano Prize, awarded for a novel "focusing on the experience of travel away from home",  endowed by Bowker's widow, named for Malcolm Lowry's novel Under the Volcano.

References

1934 births
2019 deaths
20th-century British journalists
20th-century English writers
20th-century English male writers
21st-century English writers
Alumni of the University of London
Alumni of the University of Nottingham
English biographers
English journalists
Academics of Goldsmiths, University of London